Pench National Park is a national park in India's Madhya Pradesh state, established in 1975 with an area of . It includes Pench Tiger Reserve and derives its name from the Pench River that flows through the park from north to south dividing the park into almost equal western and eastern halves, the well-forested areas of Seoni and Chhindwara districts respectively. It was declared a sanctuary in 1965, raised to the status of national park in 1975 and enlisted as a tiger reserve in 1992.
In 1983 it was declared as National Park.

The national park consists of dry deciduous forests and much fauna and flora including tigers, various types of deer and birds. In 2011, the park won the "Best Management Award". This park is accessible from Pauni on National Highway 7 and has two famous entry gates, Turiya and Karmajhiri.

Geography

Pench National Park comprises , of which  form the park's core area and Mowgli Pench Sanctuary. The remaining  form the buffer zone. The protected area is covered with small hills and teak mixed forest in the southern reaches of the Satpura Range.

Vegetation 
The forest cover in the park area includes teak mixed with other species like saja, bijiayasal, lendia, haldu, dhaora, salai, amla, amaltas. The ground is covered with maze of grasses, plants, bushes and saplings. Bamboo is also found at places. Scattered white kulu trees, also referred to as 'ghost tree', stand out conspicuously among the various hues of green. Another important tree for both wildlife and tribal people of this region is mahua. The flowers of this tree are eaten by mammals and birds, and also harvested by the tribal people as food and to brew beer.

Wildlife 
The park is home to around 40 Bengal tigers, 39 species of mammal, 13 species of reptile, 3 species of amphibian.

Commonly seen wildlife is chital, sambar, nilgai, wild boar, and jackal. Also Indian leopard, sloth bear, indian wolf, wild dog, porcupine, monkeys, jungle cat, fox, striped hyena, gaur, four-horned antelope and barking deer live in the park.

The park is rich in bird life too. According to an estimate of the wildlife authorities, the park harbours more than 210 species including several migratory ones. Some of them are peafowl, junglefowl, crow pheasant, crimson-breasted barbet, red-vented bulbul, racket-tailed drongo, Indian roller, magpie robin, lesser whistling teal, pintail, shoveller, egret and herons, minivet, oriole, wagtail, munia, myna, waterfowl and common kingfisher.

In popular culture 

Pench forest reserve, is one of the places that may have inspired Rudyard Kipling's The Jungle Book.

The Pench National Park provided the location used by the BBC for the innovative wildlife series Tiger: Spy in the Jungle, a three-part documentary narrated by Sir David Attenborough which used concealed cameras, placed by elephants, in order to capture intimate tiger behavior and also retrieved footage of various other fauna in the reserve. The programme aired for the first time in March 2008 and ended a month later.

References

External links

Central Deccan Plateau dry deciduous forests
National parks in Madhya Pradesh
Seoni district
Chhindwara district
Protected areas established in 1965
Jabalpur
1965 establishments in Madhya Pradesh